Pratyusha Banerjee (10 August 1991– 1 April 2016) was an Indian television actress. She had appeared in numerous television and reality shows.

Banerjee first gained recognition in 2010 in the television show Balika Vadhu. This was her first leading role in the television series where she earned her household name "Anandi". She had participated in the reality show Bigg Boss 7 (2013).

Career
She started her career with a supporting role in the show Rakt Sambandh which was followed by playing the role of Vaani (best friend of Akshara played by Hina Khan) in Yeh Rishta Kya Kehlata Hai on Star Plus.

She was selected for the lead role in 2010 Indian television series Balika Vadhu as an adult version of Anandi, replacing Avika Gor. According to the actress, she was chosen via a talent hunt, surpassing the contestants Nivedita Tiwari from Lucknow and Ketaki Chitale from Mumbai. Following the success of the show Banerjee participated in Jhalak Dikhhla Jaa (season 5). However, she left the dance show, stating that she was not comfortable during the dance rehearsals.

In 2013, she was one of the most competitive contestants in the seventh season of the show Bigg Boss. She appeared in Power Couple, along with her partner Rahul Raj Singh. Banerjee had played vital roles in Hum Hain Na, Sasural Simar Ka and Gulmohar Grand.

Her most notable work was in the serial Balika Vadhu and she was popularly known as Anandi.

Personal life
Pratyusha was born in a Bengali family in Jamshedpur city of Jharkhand to Shankar and Soma Banerjee. Her father is known social worker and runs their own NGO. In 2010, she left Jamshedpur to work in Mumbai.

Death
On 1 April 2016, Banerjee was found hanging in her Mumbai apartment and according to the postmortem report the cause of death was asphyxia.

However her parents allege she was murdered by her boyfriend, actor-producer Rahul Raj Singh, and passed off as suicide. They have pressed charges against him.

Television

Awards

See also
 List of Indian television actresses

References

External links

 

1991 births
2016 deaths
21st-century Indian actresses
Indian television actresses
People from Jamshedpur
Actresses from Jharkhand
Bengali actresses
2016 suicides
Suicides by hanging in India
Bigg Boss (Hindi TV series) contestants
Artists who committed suicide